Nairi Zarian (born Hayastan Yeghiazarian, January 13, 1901, Kharakonis, Ottoman Empire – July 12, 1969, Yerevan) was a Soviet and Armenian writer, poet and playwright. From 1944 to 1946, he was president of the Writers Union of Armenia. He also served the chairman of the Armenian SSR Committee for the Defense of Peace.

Biography 

An orphan and survivor of the Armenian genocide, he fled to Eastern Armenia in 1915. In 1918, he fought as part of a militia against Ottoman forces in Western Armenia. He graduated from the history department of Yerevan State University in 1927, then completed his postgraduate studies at the literary department of the Leningrad State Academy of the Arts in 1933. In the poem "Rock of Rushan" (1930) he showed "the socialistic resistance of an Armenian village". His novel "Hatsavan" (1937, completed and republished in 1947–1949) is dedicated to the process of collectivization. During World War II, Zarian published a large number of poems and notes, in 1943 finishing his poem "The voice of Homeland". In 1946 his historical tragedy Ara Geghetsik was published. From 1951 to 1958 he was a deputy in the Supreme Soviet of the Armenian SSR.

External links
 Zarian in Armeniapedia

References

1901 births
1969 deaths
20th-century Armenian dramatists and playwrights
20th-century Armenian poets
20th-century Armenian writers
20th-century male writers
Yerevan State University alumni
Recipients of the Order of Lenin
Recipients of the Order of the Red Banner of Labour
Armenian dramatists and playwrights
Armenian genocide survivors
Armenian male poets
Armenian male writers
Armenian refugees
Armenians from the Ottoman Empire
Soviet dramatists and playwrights
Soviet male poets
Burials in Armenia